Brad Teague (born December 9, 1947) is a retired American professional stock car racing driver. He is a veteran of the NASCAR Winston Cup Series, Nationwide Series, and Camping World Truck Series.

Personal life
Teague was born in Buladean, North Carolina, growing up in the mountains; he remains a resident of Johnson City.

Racing career

Teague has competed in NASCAR's top series since 1982, when he made his debut in both the Winston Cup Series (currently the Sprint Cup Series) and the Busch Series (now the Nationwide Series). He has also competed in the Sportsman Series during the 1980s, and the Craftsman Truck Series, in the late 1990s and early 2000s.

Teague's best career finish in the Winston Cup Series came at Martinsville Speedway in 1982, where he finished eleventh. In 1989 he posted the fastest time in third-day qualifying for the Daytona 500, but did not compete in the race or in the Twin 125 qualifying races. Teague attempted to qualify for the 1994 Brickyard 400 but was not fast enough to make the race.

As one of the few remaining drivers who has competed in the Xfinity Series since its founding in 1982, Teague has one career win in the series; this came at Martinsville in 1987, while driving the #75 Food Country U.S.A. Chevrolet, where he won the Miller 500. In 2004, Teague was fined $2,500 by NASCAR for a post-race altercation with members of Kevin Harvick's race team at Lowe's Motor Speedway.

Teague has also made nine starts in the Craftsman Truck Series between 1997 and 2004, posting a best finish of 13th in his first race in the series at Bristol International Raceway in 1997.

Teague competed in NASCAR in 2012, running selected races, primarily at Bristol Motor Speedway, for JD Motorsports in the No. 4 Chevrolet. 

Teague ran several races in the No. 70 Chevrolet of NEMCO-JRR Motorsports with sponsorship from SCAG Mowers.

Teague made his final NASCAR start on August 21, 2015 for the Food City 300 at Bristol Motor Speedway. Teague ran the No. 13 Automated Building Systems Toyota for MBM Motorsports. Teague was having one of his best runs in years, inside the top 25 with 5 laps to go, when he wrecked along with Harrison Rhodes, and finished the race in the 26th position.

Motorsports career results

NASCAR
(key) (Bold – Pole position awarded by qualifying time. Italics – Pole position earned by points standings or practice time. * – Most laps led.)

Nextel Cup Series

Daytona 500

Xfinity Series

Craftsman Truck Series

ARCA Permatex SuperCar Series
(key) (Bold – Pole position awarded by qualifying time. Italics – Pole position earned by points standings or practice time. * – Most laps led.)

References
Citations

Bibliography

External links
 

Living people
1947 births
People from Johnson City, Tennessee
Racing drivers from Tennessee
NASCAR drivers
ARCA Menards Series drivers